Bear Party is a 1951 picture book written and illustrated by William Pène du Bois. In order to stop fighting, koala bears throw a party. The book was a recipient of a 1952 Caldecott Honor for its illustrations.

References

1951 children's books
American picture books
Caldecott Honor-winning works